The 2015 Ebonyi State gubernatorial election was the 5th gubernatorial election of Ebonyi State. Held on April 11, 2015, the People's Democratic Party nominee Dave Umahi won the election, defeating Edward Nkwegu of the Labour Party.

PDP primary
The Deputy Governor of Ebonyi State, Dave Umahi defeated 7 other contestants to clinch the party ticket. He won with 541 votes. Other contestants in the primary were Paulinus Igwe Nwagu, Aja Nwachukwu, Offia Nwali, Paul Okorie, Hycinth Ikpo, Michael Ude Udumanta and Onyebuchi Chukwu, who was absent. 592 delegates voted in the election.

Candidates
Dave Umahi
Paulinus Igwe Nwagu
Aja Nwachukwu
Offia Nwali
Paul Okorie
Hycinth Ikpo
Michael Ude Udumanta
Onyebuchi Chukwu

LP primary
Edward Nkwegu, CEO of Edon Group clinched the party ticket.

Other governorship aspirant and party
Julius Ali Ucha, APC
Augustine Nweze, SDP
Agbo Anthony Oduma, APGA
Elizabeth Nwakaego Akpa, PPA
Gold Pascal Nwaigwe, ADC
Grace Uduma-Eze, ID
Uchenna Okocha Eze, ACPN

Results 
A total of 9 candidates contested in the election. Dave Umahi from the PDP won the election, defeating Edward Nkwegu from the LP.

Aftermath
After the election, Edward Nkwegu from the Labour Party challenged the outcome of the election at the Ebonyi State Governorship Elections Petitions Tribunal. The LP candidate told the tribunal to cancel the elections on the ground that the election was marred by irregularities and substantial non compliance with the provisions of the electoral act and some provisions of the Nigerian constitution. Edward Nkwegu also said that the election was marred by corrupt practices and that Dave Umahi did not score majority of the lawful votes cast. The tribunal dismissed the petition for lack of merit and upheld the election of Dave Umahi. The case was taken to the Appeal court, sitting in Enugu State. Delivering the judgement, the Appeal court affirmed the election of the PDP candidate, Dave Umahi and dismissed the appeal of the LP candidate for being functionally useless and lacking in merit. The case was also taken to Supreme court. On the judgement day, the Supreme court dismissed the petition for lacking merit.

References 

Ebonyi State gubernatorial elections
Ebonyi gubernatorial
April 2015 events in Nigeria